Archibald Nichols (May 12, 1819 – November 1, 1903) was a member of the Wisconsin State Assembly.

Biography
Nichols was born on May 12, 1819 in Norway, New York. An Episcopalian, Nichols married his wife, Mary, at Grace Episcopal Church in Norway on April 22, 1845 and they had five children. Nichols was a farmer by trade. He died on November 1, 1903 and was buried in Lawton, Oklahoma.

Political career
Nichols was a member of the Assembly during the 1848, 1854, 1862, 1872 and 1872 sessions representing at different times the counties of Marquette, Green Lake and Waushara. In addition, he was Chairman (similar to Mayor) of the Markesan, Wisconsin Board of Supervisors (similar to city council), a member of the Green Lake County Board of Supervisors and a justice of the peace. Nichols originally served as Whig, later as a Republican and was elected to his final term in the Assembly as an Independent.

References

External links

People from Herkimer County, New York
People from Marquette County, Wisconsin
People from Markesan, Wisconsin
People from Waushara County, Wisconsin
Members of the Wisconsin State Assembly
Mayors of places in Wisconsin
Wisconsin city council members
County supervisors in Wisconsin
American justices of the peace
Wisconsin Whigs
Wisconsin Republicans
Wisconsin Independents
Farmers from Wisconsin
1819 births
1903 deaths
Burials in Oklahoma
19th-century American judges
19th-century American Episcopalians